Paul Daniel Minick (December 17, 1899 – December 22, 1978) was a guard in the National Football League (NFL). He played with the Buffalo Bisons during the 1927 NFL season before playing two seasons with the Green Bay Packers. During his time there he was a member of the 1929 Green Bay Packers that won the NFL Championship.

References

External links

1899 births
1978 deaths
American football guards
Buffalo Bisons (NFL) players
Green Bay Packers players
Iowa Hawkeyes football players
People from Montgomery County, Iowa
Players of American football from Des Moines, Iowa